Constituency NA-206 (Larkana-III) was a constituency for the National Assembly of Pakistan. It was abolished in the 2018 delimitation after the overlap between the constituencies of Larkana District and Qambar Shahdadkot District was undone. Now the two districts have separate constituencies: NA-200 (Larkana-I), NA-201 (Larkana-II), NA-202 (Qambar Shahdadkot-I), and NA-203 (Qambar Shahdadkot-II). And the Qambar area of the former NA-206 is divided between NA-202 and NA-203.

Election 2002 

General elections were held on 10 Oct 2002. Khalid Iqbal Memon of PPP won by 36,929 votes.

Election 2008 

General elections were held on 18 Feb 2008. Mir Amir Ali Khan Magsi of PPP won by 49,524 votes.

Election 2013 

General elections were held on 11 May 2013. Mir Aamir Ali Khan Magsi of PPP won by 87,789 votes and became the  member of National Assembly.

References

External links 
Election result's official website

NA-206
Abolished National Assembly Constituencies of Pakistan